A Gringo Girl in Mexico (Spanish:Una gringuita en México) is a 1951 Mexican comedy film directed by Julián Soler and starring Antonio Badú, Martha Roth and Óscar Pulido.

Cast
 Antonio Badú as Pablo  
 Martha Roth as Barbara Smith  
 Óscar Pulido as Atenogenes  
 Fanny Schiller as Tía Rosa  
 Aurora Walker as Doña Julia  
 Roberto Coboa s Gabucho  
 Amada Dosamantes as Benita, sirvienta  
 Beatriz Saavedra as Silvia  
 Roc Galván 
 Wolf Ruvinskis 
 Ernesto Finance 
 Jaime Valdés 
 Manuel Tamés hijo 
 Enrique Zambrano 
 Francisco Fuentes as Madaleno  
 Estela Matute
 José Chávez 
 Margarita Luna 
 Hernán Vera 
 José Pardavé 
 Lupe Carriles 
 Cecilia Leger 
 Humberto Rodríguez

References

Bibliography 
  David E. Wilt. Stereotyped Images of United States Citizens in Mexican Cinema, 1930-1990. University of Maryland at College Park, 1991.

External links 
 

1951 films
1951 comedy films
Mexican comedy films
1950s Spanish-language films
Films directed by Julián Soler
Mexican black-and-white films
1950s Mexican films